South Pike County School District, formerly Murfreesboro School District, is a public school district based in Murfreesboro, Arkansas, USA.

The school district encompasses  of land in Pike and Clark counties. In addition to Murfreesboro, the district also serves Delight, Antoine, Bowen, Billstown, Pike City and Pisgah.

History
On February 25, 2010, the Delight School District, which was required to merge with another school district due to its low student population, asked the Arkansas Board of Education to be merged into the adjacent Murfreesboro district.

On July 1, 2010, the Murfreesboro School District and the Delight School District merged to form the South Pike County School District. The Murfreesboro district absorbed the Delight district and then changed its name to South Pike County School District.

Demographics
In 2010, the pre-merger Murfreesboro district had 545 students, including 482 Whites, 26 Hispanics, and 24 African-Americans.

Schools 
 Murfreesboro Elementary School, serving prekindergarten through grade 6.
 Murfreesboro High School, serving grades 7 through 12.

References

Further reading
Maps of the predecessor districts
  (Download)
  (Download)

External links

 
 
 Petition for Annexation - Delight and Murfreesboro Districts
 Murfreesboro School District No. 16 Pike County, Arkansas General Purpose Financial Statements and Other Reports June 30, 2001 
 Murfreesboro School District No. 16 Pike County, Arkansas Regulatory Basis Financial Statements And Other Reports June 30, 2009

Education in Pike County, Arkansas
Education in Clark County, Arkansas
School districts in Arkansas
2010 establishments in Arkansas
School districts established in 2010